Beylik is a Turkish word, meaning "the territory under the jurisdiction of a Bey", and may refer to:

 Duchy or principality, typically in the Middle East
 Beylik of Çubukoğulları
 Beylik of Bafra
 Beylik of Hacıemir, an beylik in the north Anatolia in a part of 14th and 15th centuries
 Beylik of Dulkadir, one of the frontier principalities
 Beylik of Erzincan, a principality in East Anatolia, Turkey in the fourteenth and early fifteenth centuries
 Beylik, Karacabey
 Beylik of Tacettin, a small Turkmen principality in Anatolia in the 14th and 15th centuries
 Beylik of Tunis
 Anatolian beyliks
 Beuluk, a member of the Ottoman Sultan's janissary bodyguard
 Bəylik (disambiguation), places in Azerbaijan
 Beylik, administrative units (historic divisions) of Crimean Khanate in Tatar Crimea